Games magazine may refer to:

 Games (magazine), an American magazine about general games
 GamesTM, a British video games magazine
 List of game magazines and :Category:Game magazines